Anna Corbella i Jordi (born 1976 Barcelona) is a Catalan sailor. In 2011, she became the first Catalan-Spanish sailor to finish the Barcelona World Race . In 2011, she was awarded the Royal Order of Sports Merit. In 2010, she was awarded the IV Women and Sport Award.

Life 
She graduated in veterinary medicine from the Autonomous University of Barcelona. She was Spanish sailing champion, in 420 (dinghy), in 1999, and 470 (dinghy) in 2000. She competed in the Mini Transat 650  regatta, finishing in 13th position.

In 2010, she participated with Dee Caffari , in the 2010-2011 Barcelona World Race,  on board the Gaes Centros Auditivos, finishing in 6th.  In 2015,  she participated with Gerard Martín, and finished 3rd.  She was the third woman to make the non-stop world tour twice.

References 

1976 births
Sailors from Catalonia
Living people
IMOCA 60 class sailors